Joe Magarac and His USA Citizen Papers is a novel for children by the American writer Irwin Shapiro (1911–1981) set in the steel valley of Pittsburgh, Pennsylvania.  It tells the story of the "legendary" steelworker Joe Magarac, who when a mill boss tells him that he needs $1,000 to get his American citizenship papers, goes on a working spree to earn the money. Magarac gets angry, however, when a U.S. Congressman tells him to go back to the Old Country where he came from. Magarac rips up rails and knocks down buildings and in a climatic rage in the manner of King Kong scales the United States Capitol in Washington, D.C.

References

1948 American novels
1948 children's books
American children's novels
Novels set in Pittsburgh
Novels about immigration to the United States